Bonza may refer to:

 a slang term in Australian English meaning "good" or "excellent"
 an Australian variety of apple
 a type of surfboard
 nickname of John Boreland (born c. 1969),  Northern Irish former footballer and loyalist activist

See also 
 Bonza, a town in Burkina Faso
 Bonza (airline), an upcoming Australian low-cost airline